Curve Creative Studio is a creative communications, marketing and branding agency based in Turin, Italy.

History
Curve Creative Studio was founded by Giovanni Sgro, Luciano Aiello, and Marco Gallo, who all returned from working abroad in the United States, Australia and Brazil respectively to open the agency. After spending some time working from one of their homes, they then moved to an office in the centre of Turin. The agency celebrated its third anniversary in July 2015. Since 2015, Curve Studio has created a Digital Division - Curve Digital Studio - specialized in augmented reality and virtual reality. 

Curve Studio has its side project Feel Desain, an online magazine that offers every day a fresh insight into the emerging design scenario including innovation, product design, fashion, graphics, art and so much more. The paper magazine was released in 2014, while the second issue in May 2018 on the occasion of Forward Festivals in Munich, Germany.

Notable campaigns
The agency has worked on campaigns for a number of clients in different sectors. 
In 2013, Curve Creative Studio worked on a campaign for Martini & Rossi’s 150th Anniversary, for which it collaborated with artist Kurt Perschke, who was working on his RedBall project at the time.
The agency has also worked on the branding of Lentini's Pizza & Restaurant in Turin. Curve Studio has worked with Uber, Ferrero, Airbnb, FCA Italy, Esselunga, Compagnia di San Paolo and Museum Card Association Abbonamento Musei Piemonte Torino.

In 2017, the agency worked with Italian brand Molecola and designed the new bottle Molecola 90-60-90, the first 100 % cola of Italy. The characteristics of the product are inspired by classic elements of Italian culture, fashion, style and screen divas such as Sofia Loren. The resulting bottle is a seductive shape with a woven texture, imprinted into the glass, reminiscent of a high fashion dress. In 2018, won two International Design Awards (IDA) Gold Prizes in Los Angeles.

See also
Feel Desain

References

External links
Curve Creative Studio
Custom SEO Solutions

Marketing companies
Companies of Italy
Advertising agencies of Italy
Italian companies established in 2012
Marketing companies established in 2012